Pakeha is a genus of South Pacific araneomorph spiders in the family Cycloctenidae, first described by Raymond Robert Forster & C. L. Wilton in 1973.

Species
 it contains eighteen species:
Pakeha buechlerae Forster & Wilton, 1973 — New Zealand
Pakeha duplex Forster & Wilton, 1973 — New Zealand
Pakeha hiloa Forster & Wilton, 1973 — New Zealand
Pakeha inornata Forster & Wilton, 1973 — New Zealand
Pakeha insignita Forster & Wilton, 1973 — New Zealand
Pakeha kirki (Hogg, 1909) — New Zealand (Snares Is.)
Pakeha lobata Forster & Wilton, 1973 — New Zealand
Pakeha manapouri Forster & Wilton, 1973 — New Zealand
Pakeha maxima Forster & Wilton, 1973 — New Zealand
Pakeha media Forster & Wilton, 1973 — New Zealand
Pakeha minima Forster & Wilton, 1973 — New Zealand
Pakeha paratecta Forster & Wilton, 1973 — New Zealand
Pakeha parrotti Forster & Wilton, 1973 — New Zealand
Pakeha protecta Forster & Wilton, 1973 — New Zealand
Pakeha pula Forster & Wilton, 1973 — New Zealand
Pakeha stewartia Forster & Wilton, 1973 — New Zealand
Pakeha subtecta Forster & Wilton, 1973 — New Zealand
Pakeha tecta Forster & Wilton, 1973 — New Zealand

References

Araneomorphae genera
Cycloctenidae
Taxa named by Raymond Robert Forster